The Rakkaia were an indigenous Australian people, from what is now Queensland.

Country

Alternative name
 Rukkia.

Notes

Citations

Sources

Aboriginal peoples of Queensland